Thinouia is a genus of flowering plants belonging to the family Sapindaceae. It is also in the Sapindoideae subfamily and Paullinieae tribe.

Its native range is parts of Central America (within Belize, Costa Rica, El Salvador, Guatemala, Honduras, Mexico and Panamá) and South America (within (northern) Argentina, Bolivia, Brazil, Colombia, Ecuador, French Guiana, Guyana, Paraguay, Peru and Venezuela). 

The genus name of Thinouia is in honour of André Thouin (1747–1824), a French botanist.
It was first described and published by George Bentham in London J. Bot. Vol.4 on page 633 in 1845.

Known species 
According to Kew:
Thinouia compressa 
Thinouia mucronata 
Thinouia myriantha 
Thinouia obliqua 
Thinouia paraguaiensis 
Thinouia restingae 
Thinouia scandens 
Thinouia ternata 
Thinouia tomocarpa 
Thinouia trifoliolata 
Thinouia ventricosa

References

Sapindaceae
Sapindaceae genera
Plants described in 1845
Flora of Veracruz
Flora of Central Mexico
Flora of Central America
Flora of French Guiana
Flora of Venezuela
Flora of western South America
Flora of Brazil
Flora of Northeast Argentina
Flora of Northwest Argentina
Flora of Paraguay
[[